Chang'e 6 is a planned robotic Chinese lunar exploration mission that is expected to launch in 2025 and perform China's second sample return mission. Like its predecessors, the spacecraft is named after the Chinese moon goddess Chang'e.

Overview 
The Chinese Lunar Exploration Program is designed to be conducted in four phases of incremental technological advancement: The first is reaching lunar orbit, completed by Chang'e 1 in 2007 and Chang'e 2 in 2010. The second is landing and roving on the Moon, as Chang'e 3 did in 2013 and Chang'e 4 did in 2019. The third is collecting lunar samples from the near-side and sending them to Earth, completed by Chang'e 5 in 2020 and planned for the Chang'e 6 mission. The fourth phase consists of development of a robotic research station near the Moon's south pole. The program aims to facilitate a crewed lunar landing in the 2030s and possibly build an outpost near the lunar south pole.

Mission architecture

Chang'e 6 was built as a copy and backup of Chang'e 5. The ascent vehicle will then make a fully autonomous and robotic rendezvous and dock with an orbiter where the samples will be robotically transferred into a sample-return capsule for their delivery to Earth.

Science payloads
In November 2022 it was announced that the mission would carry payloads from four international partners:
 a French instrument called DORN (Detection of Outgassing Radon) to study the transport of lunar dust and other volatiles between the lunar regolith and the lunar exosphere, including the water cycle;
 an Italian instrument called INRRI (INstrument for landing-Roving laser Retroreflector Investigations) consisting in a passive laser retro-reflector to be used for laser range-finding of the lander, similar to those used on the Schiaparelli and InSight missions;
 thr Swedish NILS (Negative Ions on Lunar Surface), an instrument to detect and measure negative ions reflected by the lunar surface;
 the Pakistani ICECUBE-Q cubesat, to detect ice traces on the lunar surface.

Launch
The probe will be launched by a Long March 5 rocket in 2025, from Wenchang Satellite Launch Center on Hainan Island.

References

External links
China's Deep Space Exploration Roadmap. (2018)

Chinese Lunar Exploration Program
Missions to the Moon
Sample return missions
Chinese space probes
2024 in China
2024 in spaceflight